Elections to Bolton Metropolitan Borough Council were held on 6 May 2010, on the same day as the General Election which led to a much higher turnout than in recent years. One third of the council was up for election and the council stayed under no overall control.

20 seats were contested with 13 being won by the Labour Party, 6 by the Conservatives and 1 by the Liberal Democrats.

In the Smithills ward, the Lib Dems held the seat but defeated the sitting Councillor, R Silvester, who had previously moved from the Lib Dems to the Labour Party.

After the election, the total composition of the council was:
Labour 30
Conservative 22
Liberal Democrats 8

Election result

Council Composition
Prior to the election the composition of the council was:

After the election the composition of the council was:

Ward results

Astley Bridge ward

Bradshaw ward

Breightmet ward

Bromley Cross ward

Crompton ward

Farnworth ward

Great Lever ward

Halliwell ward

Harper Green ward

Heaton and Lostock ward

Horwich and Blackrod ward

Horwich North East ward

Hulton ward

Kearsley ward

Little Lever and Darcy Lever ward

Rumworth ward

Smithills ward

Tonge with the Haulgh ward

Westhoughton North and Chew Moor ward

Westhoughton South ward

References

Bolton Council Elections 2010: Candidates (Bolton Council)
General Election 2010 – Bolton (Bolton News)
Local Election Results, 2010 (Bolton Council)
Labour makes more gains in Bolton local elections (Bolton News)

2010
2010 English local elections
May 2010 events in the United Kingdom
2010s in Greater Manchester